Oscar Peterson and Jon Faddis is a 1975 studio album by Oscar Peterson, featuring Jon Faddis.

Track listing
 "Things Ain't What They Used to Be" (Mercer Ellington, Ted Persons)  – 10:23
 "Autumn Leaves" (Joseph Kosma, Johnny Mercer, Jacques Prévert) – 6:51
 "Take the "A" Train" (Billy Strayhorn) – 7:58
 "Blues for Birks" (Jon Faddis, Oscar Peterson) – 7:22
 "Summertime" (George Gershwin, Ira Gershwin, DuBose Heyward) – 7:28
 "Lester Leaps In" (Lester Young) – 6:25

Personnel
Recorded June 5, 1975:
 Oscar Peterson - piano
 Jon Faddis - trumpet
 Norman Granz - producer

References

1975 albums
Oscar Peterson albums
Jon Faddis albums
Pablo Records albums
Albums produced by Norman Granz